is an indoor stadium in Bunkyo, Tokyo, Japan. It was designed as a baseball stadium following its predecessor, Korakuen Stadium (whose former site is now occupied by the Tokyo Dome Hotel and a plaza for this stadium). Construction on the stadium began on May 16, 1985, and it opened on March 17, 1988. It was built on the site of the Velodrome, adjacent to Korakuen Stadium. It has a maximum total capacity of 57,000 depending on configuration, with an all-seating configuration of 42,000.

Tokyo Dome's original nickname was "The Big Egg", with some calling it the "Tokyo Big Egg". Its dome-shaped roof is an air-supported structure, a flexible membrane supported by slightly pressurizing the inside of the stadium. It was developed by Nikken Sekkei and Takenaka Corporation. It was modeled after the Hubert H. Humphrey Metrodome.

It is the home field of the Yomiuri Giants baseball team. On March 18, 1988, the day after the Tokyo Dome opened, the Yomiuri Giants held the game as the first event of the Tokyo Dome. The Yomiuri Giants host about 70 games a year at their home stadium, Tokyo Dome, and other Nippon Professional Baseball teams sometimes host several games a year at the Tokyo Dome. If the Yomiuri Giants advance to the Climax Series or the Japan Series, additional games will be held at Tokyo Dome. Interleague play, in which the Yomiuri Giants participates, will also be held at the Tokyo Dome. In 2021, the Tokyo Yakult Swallows advanced to the Japan Series, but they held the Japan Series at Tokyo Dome instead of their home stadium, Meiji Jingu Stadium. This was because the Japan Series had to be rescheduled due to the spread of COVID-19 infectious disease, and the dates overlapped with the game days of amateur baseball tournaments at Meiji Jingu Stadium. Tokyo Dome is also the location of the Japanese Baseball Hall of Fame which chronicles the history of baseball in Japan.

It has also hosted international baseball tournaments such as the World Baseball Classic and WBSC Premier12, Major League Baseball, music concerts, basketball, American football, and association football games, as well as puroresu (pro-wrestling) matches, mixed martial arts events, kickboxing events, and monster truck races. It became the first Japanese venue with an American football attendance above 50,000.

Tokyo Dome City

Tokyo Dome is part of a greater entertainment complex known as Tokyo Dome City, built of the grounds of the former Tokyo Koishikawa arsenal. Tokyo Dome City includes an amusement park and Tokyo Dome City Attractions (formerly Kōrakuen Grounds). This amusement park occupies the former Korakuen Stadium site and includes a roller coaster named Thunder Dolphin and a hubless Ferris wheel. The grounds also have an onsen called Spa LaQua, various shops, restaurants, video game centers, the largest JRA WINS horse race betting complex in Tokyo, and Oft Korakuen, which caters to rural horse races.

Notable events other than Japanese professional baseball

International baseball tournaments and Major League Baseball
Tokyo Dome has been chosen as one of the baseball stadiums to hold international baseball tournaments since 2000s. The Tokyo Dome has been selected to host all five World Baseball Classics through 2023. It was also selected to host the finals of the WBSC Premier 12, which was held twice.

The Tokyo Dome has held various Major League Baseball games to open the seasons, with the first series—a two-game slate between the Chicago Cubs and New York Mets in 2000—being the first time American MLB teams have played regular season games in Asia. Four years later, the New York Yankees, featuring former Yomiuri Giants slugger/outfielder Hideki Matsui in their lineup, and the Tampa Bay Devil Rays played two games in the stadium to start the 2004 season. The Boston Red Sox and the Oakland Athletics opened the 2008 MLB season in Japan, and also competed against Japanese teams. To open the 2012 season the Seattle Mariners and the Athletics, the former of which had Ichiro Suzuki, played a two-game series on March 28–29. In game one Seattle – led by Ichiro's 4 hits – won 3–1 in 11 innings. The Mariners and Athletics returned to the Tokyo Dome for a two-game series to begin the 2019 Major League Baseball season, with Ichiro retiring from professional baseball after the second game.

Concert 
Tokyo Dome Co., Ltd. publishes a list of singers and music groups that have performed since its opening in 1988. The Alfee held its first concert at Tokyo Dome on March 19, 1988, and March 20, two days after the dome opened. On March 22, 1988, and March 23, Mick Jagger became the first non-Japanese to perform at the Tokyo Dome.

Concerts have been held at the Tokyo Dome for several dozen days each year since its opening, mainly by Japanese singers and music groups. According to official statistics from its opening in 1988 to December 2022, KinKi Kids held the most solo concerts at Tokyo Dome for 64 days, followed by Arashi for 58 days and SMAP for 40 days. All of them were male idol groups from Johnny & Associates. Among non-Japanese, The Rolling Stones and TVXQ held the most solo concerts for 28 days, followed by Michael Jackson for 25 days.

Professional wrestling

New Japan Pro-Wrestling has held a flagship professional wrestling event at Tokyo Dome, currently titled Wrestle Kingdom,  on January 4 of each year, since 1992. The event expanded in 2020 to two nights, with the second night on January 5. The event is the biggest in Japanese professional wrestling, and has been compared to WWE's flagship U.S. event WrestleMania in terms of size and significance.
Other companies such as All Japan Pro Wrestling, Pro Wrestling NOAH, and WWE had previously held major events in the Tokyo Dome as well.

Boxing
In boxing, Mike Tyson fought twice in Tokyo Dome — a successful undisputed title defense against Tony Tubbs in 1988, and in a loss considered to be one of the biggest upsets in sports history to James "Buster" Douglas in 1990.

Kickboxing
The final round of the K-1 World Grand Prix kickboxing tournament was held at the Tokyo Dome from 1997 to 2006.

Mixed martial arts
The Tokyo Dome hosted seven Pride FC mixed martial arts fights: Pride 1, Pride 4, Pride Grand Prix 2000 Opening Round, Pride Grand Prix 2000 Finals, Pride 17, Pride 23, and Pride Final Conflict 2003. The last event had an attendance of 67,451.

American football

As part of the American Bowl, the Tokyo Dome held 13 National Football League preseason games between 1989 and 2005. In the 1996 game between the San Diego Chargers and Pittsburgh Steelers, three Japanese linebackers – Takuro Abe, Shigemasa Ito, and Takahiro Ikenoue of the World League of American Football – became the first Japanese players to participate in an NFL game; Abe and Ito sporadically appeared on special teams for the Chargers, while Ikenoue was part of the Steelers' defense.

Association football
In 1993, Aston Villa played Verdy Kawasaki in a friendly match.

Monster truck rallies 
In 1989, the United States Hot Rod Association hosted one of the first monster truck rallies outside North America at the Tokyo Dome.

Figure skating 
In December 2022, Japanese figure skater and two-time Olympic champion, Yuzuru Hanyu, announced to hold a solo ice show named Gift at the Tokyo Dome on February 26, 2023. His show will mark the first time that an ice rink will be set up at the multipurpose venue. The show will be directed in collaboration with Japanese choreographer Mikiko.

See also

List of thin shell structures
Romexpo Dome
Thin-shell structure

References

External links

Tokyo Dome official website

Air-supported structures
American Bowl venues
American football in Japan
American football venues in Japan
Basketball venues in Japan
Buildings and structures in Bunkyō
Covered stadiums in Japan
Football venues in Japan
Sports venues completed in 1988
Music venues completed in 1988
Indoor arenas in Japan
January 4 Tokyo Dome Show
Lattice shell structures
Major League Baseball venues
Music venues in Tokyo
Nippon Professional Baseball venues
Sports venues in Tokyo
World Baseball Classic venues
Yomiuri Giants
1988 establishments in Japan